This is a list of notable sweet puddings that conform to one of two definitions:
A dish consisting of a fluid mixture of various ingredients baked, steamed or boiled into a solid mass
A dessert consisting of sweetened milk thickened to a creamy consistency, either by cooking or the addition of starch or other thickening agent

Puddings

See also

 List of savoury puddings
 List of baked goods
 List of custard desserts
 List of desserts

References

Further reading
 

Puddings
Puddings